Ikhfanul Alam (born, 17 February 1992 in Indonesia), is an Indonesian professional footballer who plays for Liga 1 club Arema. He is also a Police Brigadier 1st Class  in the Indonesian Police.

Club career

Arema
On 16 January 2019, Alam signed a one-year contract with Arema on a free transfer, along with Sandy Firmansyah, Rachmat Latief. He made his league debut for Arema when he was part of the starting lineup of a 2019 Liga 1 match against Persipura Jayapura on 4 July 2019, in which Arema won.

Badak Lampung
On February 2020, Alam joined Liga 2 side Badak Lampung, he will wear jersey number 87, he never forgets number 87 which is the year Arema was founded. The jersey number was chosen at this time who have officially joined the team. He chose the number 87 jersey because of his love for the team nicknamed Singo Edan.

Return to Arema
On 3 March 2021, Alam decided to re-join Arema for the 2021–22 season. Family factors are a big consideration behind his career choice, he is currently also waiting for the birth of his first child.

Honours

Club

Arema
 Indonesia President's Cup: 2019, 2022

References

1992 births
Living people
Arema F.C. players
Perserang Serang players
Badak Lampung F.C. players
Bhayangkara F.C. players
Kalteng Putra F.C. players
Persiba Balikpapan players
PSIR Rembang players
Liga 1 (Indonesia) players
Liga 2 (Indonesia) players
Indonesian footballers
Association football central defenders
People from Malang
Sportspeople from East Java
Sportspeople from Malang
21st-century Indonesian people